Leptosphaeria orae-maris is a marine fungus. The chemical compound leptosphaerin has been isolated from it.

References

Fungal plant pathogens and diseases
Pleosporales